Elgin High School is a public high school near Marion, Ohio.  It is the only high school in the Elgin Local Schools district.  The school's team name is the Comets. The school enrollment is 271 as of the 2020-21 school year.

Notable alumni
 Toby Harrah, Former MLB player (Washington Senators, Texas Rangers, Cleveland Indians, New York Yankees)
 Brian Agler, Former WNBA coach

Notes and references

High schools in Marion County, Ohio
Public high schools in Ohio
Buildings and structures in Marion, Ohio